Grieveson may refer to:

Joy Grieveson (born 1941), British track and field athlete
Mildred Grieveson (born 1936), British author of romance novels (pen name Anne Mather)
Ronnie Grieveson OBE (1909–1998), South African cricketer
Steven Grieveson (born 1970), British serial killer known as the Sunderland Strangler

See also
Grieveson Grant, stockbroking firm on the London Stock Exchange
Graveson
Greeson
Grieve
Grieves